William Mullins (born 30 January 1948 in Campsie, New South Wales) is an Australian former rugby league footballer who played during the 1960s and 1970s in the New South Wales Rugby League premiership, the major rugby league competition in Australia at the time.

Career

Eastern Suburbs Roosters
A former professional runner, Mullins played his junior football with the Canterbury-Bankstown club before joining Eastern Suburbs in 1968 where he played 190 first grade matches in the years until 1978. At the time of his retirement, he was the club's leading try-scorer with 104 tries.

A tall, powerfully built ,  Mullins played in some of the great Easts sides of the seventies, winning premierships in 1974 and 1975, and finishing runners up in 1972 Grand Final. He also won pre-season cups in 1974 and 1977, mid-week cups in 1975 and 1978.

Mullins was a representative of City Firsts and New South Wales, though injuries suffered at the wrong times during his career prevented him from representing his country. In a trial  for World Cup selection in 1971, Mullins suffered a broken jaw and again, in 1973 when he was 'king hit' in a game against Manly-Warringah costing him any chance of being selected to the 1973 Kangaroo tour.

Young Cherry Pickers
At the end of the 1978 season Mullins moved to the rural NSW town of Young where he played for the Young Cherry Pickers, but a series of broken legs brought about an end to his rugby league career.

Personal life
Mullins for many years owned a fish and chip shop in Sydney's Charing Cross.

The burly winger has been included in a side made up of East's greatest ever players. He has also been named in the Young Cherry Pickers best side since its inception in the 1950s.

Brothers Russell and Terry Mullins played for Sydney's Western Suburbs Magpies against Bill and his son Brett Mullins is an Australian representative who has won premierships with Canberra and Sydney Roosters.

Mullins is the grandfather of the rugby league footballer for the Canterbury Bankstown Bulldogs; Jack Hetherington and Canberra Raiders outside back James Schiller.

References

1948 births
Living people
Australian rugby league players
New South Wales rugby league team players
Rugby league players from Campsie, New South Wales
Rugby league wingers
Sydney Roosters players